Qullar (also, Gullar) is a village and municipality in the Qusar District of Azerbaijan. It has a population of 303.

References 

Populated places in Qusar District